Karl Henrik Johansson (born 1967 in Växjö, Sweden) is a Swedish researcher and best known for his pioneering contributions to networked control systems, cyber-physical systems, and hybrid systems. His research has had particular application impact in transportation, automation, and energy networks. He holds a Chaired Professorship in Networked Control at the KTH Royal Institute of Technology in Stockholm, Sweden. He is Director of KTH Digital Futures.

Career
Karl H. Johansson graduated from Lund University in Sweden with an MSc in 1992 and a PhD in 1997. He did a postdoc at UC Berkeley 1998-2000 and has since  then held the positions of Assistant, Associate, and Full Professor at the Department of Automatic Control at KTH Royal Institute of Technology. 
He has directed the ACCESS Linnaeus Centre 2009-2016 and the Strategic Research Area ICT TNG 2013-2020, two of the largest research environments in electrical engineering and computer science in Sweden. He has held visiting positions at UC Berkeley, California Institute of Technology, Nanyang Technological University, Hong Kong University of Science and Technology Institute of Advanced Studies, Norwegian University of Science and Technology, and Zhejiang University. 

He is a member of the Swedish Research Council's Scientific Council for Natural Sciences and Engineering Sciences. He has served on the IEEE Control Systems Society Board of Governors, the IFAC Executive Board, and he is currently the Vice-President of the European Control Association. He is past Chair of the IFAC Technical Committee on Networked Systems. 

He has been on the Editorial Boards of Automatica, IEEE Transactions on Automatic Control, IEEE Transactions on Control of Network Systems, and IET Control Theory and Applications. He currently serves on the Editorial Boards of
Annual Review of Control, Robotics, and Autonomous Systems and European Journal of Control. He was the General Chair of the ACM/IEEE Cyber-Physical Systems Week 2010 and IPC Chair of many conferences. 

His research focuses on networked control systems, cyber-physical systems, and applications in transportation, energy, and automation networks; areas in which he has co-authored more than 700 journal and conference papers. He has advised more than 40 postdocs and 20 PhD students.

Honours 
Karl H. Johansson has received several best paper awards and other distinctions from IEEE, IFAC, and ACM. In 2017 he was awarded Distinguished Professor of the Swedish Research Council and in 2009 he was awarded Wallenberg Scholar, as one of the first ten scholars from all sciences, by the Knut and Alice Wallenberg Foundation. He was awarded Future Research Leader from the Swedish Foundation for Strategic Research in 2005. He received the triennial Young Author Prize from IFAC in 1996 and the Peccei Award from IIASA, Austria, in 1993. He was granted Young Researcher Awards from Scania AB in 1996 and from Ericsson in 1998 and 1999. He is Fellow of the IEEE and the Royal Swedish Academy of Engineering Sciences, and he is Distinguished Lecturer with the IEEE Control Systems Society.

Works
 D. V. Dimarogonas, E. Frazzoli, K. H. Johansson, "Distributed event-triggered control for multi-agent systems," IEEE Transactions on Automatic Control, vol. 57, no. 5, pp. 1291-1297, May 2012. doi: 10.1109/TAC.2011.2174666
 K. H. Johansson, "The quadruple-tank process: a multivariable laboratory process with an adjustable zero," in IEEE Transactions on Control Systems Technology, vol. 8, no. 3, pp. 456-465, May 2000. doi: 10.1109/87.845876
 J. Lygeros, K. H. Johansson, S. N. Simic, J. Zhang, S. S. Sastry, "Dynamical properties of hybrid automata," in IEEE Transactions on Automatic Control, vol. 48, no. 1, pp. 2-17, Jan. 2003. doi: 10.1109/TAC.2002.806650
 A. Teixeira, I. Shames, H. Sandberg, K. H. Johansson, "A secure control framework for resource-limited adversaries," Automatica, Volume 51, 2015, Pages 135-148, ISSN 0005-1098, doi.org/10.1016/j.automatica.2014.10.067
 B. Besselink, V. Turri, S. H. van de Hoef, K.-Y. Liang, A. Alam, J. Mårtensson, K. H. Johansson, "Cyber–physical control of road freight transport," in Proceedings of the IEEE, vol. 104, no. 5, pp. 1128-1141, May 2016. doi: 10.1109/JPROC.2015.2511446
 A. Keimer, N. Laurent-Brouty, F. Farokhi, H. Signargout, V. Cvetkovic, A. M. Bayen, K. H. Johansson, "Information patterns in the modeling and design of mobility management services," in Proceedings of the IEEE, vol. 106, no. 4, pp. 554-576, April 2018. doi: 10.1109/JPROC.2018.2800001

References

External links 
 Personal Website
 Google Scholar
 KAW article on energy savings through connected devices and vehicles
 KAW article on theory of the interconnected society
 KAW article on coming to terms with self-driving vehicles (in Swedish)

Living people
1967 births
Fellow Members of the IEEE
Swedish electrical engineers
Lund University alumni
Control theorists